NITI is a very light-weight, stealthy remote-controlled Bulgarian unmanned aerial vehicle (UAV). It has been designed and constructed in 2006 by Armstechno Ltd. It mounts a color surveillance camera, a thermal vision camera, and has an option for adding chemical and radioactive contamination dosimeters. Its main tasks are air surveillance of contaminated areas, regions with possible terrorist group activity, artillery correction or observation of natural disaster-stricken areas. NITI has a maximum fuel capacity of 38 L. It also has a programmable autopilot system and GPS system. 

In 2011, NITI was evaluated by the Ministry of the Interior (MI) of Bulgaria, but the design was rejected due to numerous defects, an unreliable design and the inability of the aircraft to perform its tasks. The CEO of Armstechno Co. blamed the unsatisfactory performance of its UAVs on the poor training of MI operators.

Specifications

See also 
 RQ-2 Pioneer
 RQ-11 Raven

References

External links
 BGsoldier.eamci.bg (in Bulgarian)

Unmanned aerial vehicles of Bulgaria
2000s Bulgarian military reconnaissance aircraft
NITI
Single-engined pusher aircraft
Twin-boom aircraft
Unmanned military aircraft